Eraldo Çinari (born 11 October 1996) is an Albanian professional footballer who plays as a forward for North Macedonia club Shkëndija .

Club career
Çinari made his debut for the Vllaznia Shkodër team on 7 December 2014 against Elbasani in a 4–1 away win at the age of 18, and he has been a first team member ever since.

He made his 100th Kategoria Superiore appearance on 15 April 2018 in the 2–0 loss to fellow relegation strugglers Teuta.

International career
On 24 March 2018, Çinari received his first call-up to the Albania under-21 squad as a replacement of Keidi Bare for the 2019 UEFA European Under-21 Championship qualification match versus Slovakia. He started the match three days later and played full-90 minutes as Albania lost 4–1 at Štadión pod Dubňom, decreasing their chances to qualify.

Career statistics

Club

References

External links
Profile at Football.com

1996 births
Living people
Footballers from Shkodër
Albanian footballers
Albanian expatriate footballers
Albania youth international footballers
Association football forwards
KF Vllaznia Shkodër players
FK Partizani Tirana players
Samsunspor footballers
TFF First League players
Kategoria Superiore players
Albanian expatriate sportspeople in Turkey
Expatriate footballers in Turkey